Katarzyna Ostrogska was the name of several Polish–Lithuanian noblewomen:

Katarzyna Ostrogska (1560–1579), wife of Krzysztof Mikołaj Radziwiłł
Katarzyna Ostrogska (1602–1642), wife of Tomasz Zamoyski